Jan Kobell (born Delfshaven, 1779; died Amsterdam, 14 September 1814) was a Dutch animal and landscape painter.

Biography
He was a pupil of Willem Rutgaart van der Wall at Utrecht. He studied diligently from nature, and took Paul Potter for his model, acquiring his talent for animal as well as landscape work. In 1812 he went to Paris, where he won the gold medal and high praise from art critics. His popularity increased rapidly until his premature death. Of his cattle pieces, noted for their technique and precision of drawing, there are excellent specimens in the museums of Amsterdam and Rotterdam.

Family
Jan Kobell was the son of Hendrik Kobell. He is often called Jan Kobell II to distinguish him from his uncle, or Jan Kobell the elder to distinguish him from his cousin.  The uncle Jan Kobell (born Rotterdam, 1756; died 1833) engraved anatomical plates, and his only well-known work was a series of historical portraits (1787).  The cousin Jan Kobell (born Rotterdam 1800; died 1838) was a landscape and cattle painter. He was the son of Jan the engraver uncle. He attended Rotterdam Academy, and painted his principal work, a life-size cattle piece, in 1830. Anna (1795–1847), sister of Jan the younger, was also a noted artist.

Notes

References

Attribution
 
 
 

1779 births
1814 deaths
19th-century Dutch painters
Dutch male painters
Painters from Rotterdam
19th-century Dutch male artists